Ashanti Gold Sporting Club popularly known as AshGold is a Ghanaian football team based in the gold mining town of Obuasi, south of Kumasi the capital of Ashanti Region. The club are currently competing in the Ghana Premier League.

History
Ashanti Gold SC was founded in 1978 by a group of employees of the Ashanti Goldfields Corporation under the name of Goldfields Sporting Club famously known as Obuasi Goldfields.  The employees pleaded with management of AGC to sponsor the team, but they were always refused. The employees continued to pay the salaries and costs for the team and in the 1984 season the club finished as runner-up in the  FA Cup. The management took notice and, through their leading shareholder Lonrho, arranged funding and sent an English manager to help the fledgling team. Still, no senior management was brought in to run the club. Because of their success in the FA cup, the team was promoted to  Ghana Premier League the most elite football division. For almost a decade the team struggled due to disorganization, until 1993 when a company official at AGC revamped the club and brought in another English manager. 2004 Obuasi Goldfields Sporting Club Ltd. were renamed AshantiGold Sporting Club Ltd. on April 16 due to AshantiGold Sporting Club's former owners Ashanti Goldfields Corporation.

Years of success
That next season, AshGold finished third in the division after only Ashanti powerhouses Asante Kotoko. The next year a 13-man Board of Directors was established and AshGold won the league. Over the next two years, AshGold won the league again.

Pan-African Cups
The AshGold has competed in four competitions representing Ashanti. In 1995 they reached the quarter-finals in the African Champions League and in 1996 only into the final 16. In 1997 they were the runners up of the African Champions League.

Recent years

Ashanti Gold SC has never matched the greatness of their three-year cup run, but have remained a top team in the First Capital Plus Bank Premier League. They continue to produce excellent footballers who have played throughout Europe. AshGold goalkeeper George Owu, joined the Black Stars in their quest for the FIFA 2006 World Cup, but did not appear in a game.

“Ashantigold SC will be demoted to Division Two League after being found guilty of match manipulation in their fixture against Inter Allies FC,” read part of the statement released by Ghana FA.
“The decision takes effect from the 2022-23 league season. Officials of the club and players, who participated in the above-mentioned match have also been sanctioned by the disciplinary committee.”
There were several reports within the local and international football space that the matchday 34 fixture at the Obuasi Len Clay Stadium on July 17 2021, which Ashantigold won 7-0, had been fixed to fulfil a correct score of five goals to one in their favour. The committee further explained the sanctions meted on Ashantigold: “That at the end of the 2021-22 Ghana Premier League season, Ashantigold shall be demoted to the Division Two League in accordance with Article 6(3)(h) of the GFA Disciplinary Code 2019.

Grounds 
Ashanti Gold play their home matches at Len Clay Stadium.

Honours

Official trophies (recognized by CAF and FIFA)

National
Ghana Premier League: 4’’’'
1993–94, 1994–95, 1995–96, 2015

MTN FA Cup: 1
1992–93
Finalist: 1984, 2011–12

International
CAF Champions League
Runners-up: 1997

Other trophies
Ghana Telecom Gala: 1
1995–96

Performance in CAF competitions
CAF Champions League: 4 appearances
1997 – Finalist
2007 – First Round
2008 – First Round
2016 Preliminary round

African Cup of Champions Clubs: 1 appearance
1996 – Second Round

CAF Confederation Cup: 2 appearances
2011 – First Round
2019 — First Round

CAF Cup: 2 appearances
2001 – Quarter-finals
2002 – First Round

Current squad

As of December 2020

Former notable players
 Abubakar Yakubu
 Johnathan Mensah
 Mubarak Wakaso

Former coaches
 Paulistinha - Oswaldo Sampaio Júnior - former player of Botafogo FC in the 1960's. - Died in 2005 in Rio de Janeiro https://pt.wikipedia.org/wiki/Paulistinha_(futebolista)
 Mohammed Gargo
 Momčilo "Momo" Medić
 Cecil Jones Attuquayefio (1990–93)
 Dave Booth (1991–94)
 Charles Gyamfi (1992–93)
 Cecil Jones Attuquayefio (1993–95)
 Hans van der Pluijm (July 1, 2000 – June 30, 2002), (July 1, 2004 – Oct 5, 2005)
 Sam Arday (Oct 31, 2004 – May 31, 2005)
 David Duncan (July 1, 2005 – June 30, 2008)
 Zdravko Logarušić (July 1, 2010 – Dec 15, 2011)
 Joachim Yaw Acheampong (Dec 15, 2011 – Dec 18, 2012)
 Mehdi Pashazadeh (Feb 13, 2012–2013)
 Bashir Hayford (Jan 1, 2013 – 2017)
 Charles Akonnor (Jan 2017 – July 2018)
 Milovan Cirkovic (November 2020– February 2021)

Farm team
Royal Knight F.C. is a Division Two League football club based in Nsawam, Eastern region and is also operating as a reserve team for Ashanti Gold SC. The club is currently not in operation.

References

External links

Ashanti Gold S.C. at Global Sports Archive 
Ashanti Gold S.C. at Soccerway

Football clubs in Ghana
Association football clubs established in 1978
1978 establishments in Ghana
Sports clubs in Ghana
Ashanti Region